Jaso or Jassu, formerly known as Yashogarh was a princely state of the Bundelkhand Agency in British India located in present-day Nagod tehsil, Satna district, Madhya Pradesh. 
It was surrounded in the north, east and south by Nagod State and in the east by Ajaigarh.

History
Jaso State was founded in 1732 by Bharti Chand, younger brother of Raja Hrideshah of Panna. Around 1750, it was split into Bandhora and Jaso, being reunited later in the eighteenth century.
In 1816 Jaso State became a British protectorate. The last ruler of the state signed the accession of Jaso State to the Indian Union in 1948.

Rulers
Rulers bore the title of Diwan

 1732 – 1750  Bharti Chand
 1750 – 1775  Hari Singh
 1775 – 1786  Chet Singh
 1786 – 1830  Murat Singh
 1830 – 1860  Ishri Singh (b. ... – d. 1860)
 1860 – 1865  Ram Singh (b. ... – d. 1860)
 1860 – 1869  Shatarjit Singh (adopted son and descendant of Dewan Chet Singh)
 1869 – 1876  Bhopal Singh
 1876 – 1888  Gajraj Singh
 1888 – 1889  Chhatrapati Singh
 7 July 1889 – 1900  Jagat Raj Singh
 1900 – 1918  Girwar Singh
 1918 – 1942  Ram Pratap Singh
 1947 – 2020  Anand Pratap Singh 
2020 - present Harsh Pratap Singh

Rulers of Bandhora
Durjan Singh and Medni Singh ruled as the Dewans of Bandhora when the state was split from Jaso in the 18th century.

See also
 Bagelkhand Agency
 List of Indian princely states

References

Princely states of India
History of Madhya Pradesh
Rajputs
Satna district
1732 establishments in India
1948 disestablishments in India